Bembecia hymenopteriformis is a moth of the family Sesiidae. It is found in Spain, mainland Italy and on Sicily. It is also known from the Maghreb countries in North Africa.

The wingspan is 18–19 mm.

The larvae feed on Anthyllis (including Anthyllis vulneraria) and Lotus species (including Lotus creticus and Lotus corniculatus).

References

Moths described in 1860
Sesiidae
Moths of Europe
Moths of Africa